"Runaway (U & I)" is a song by Swedish electronic music duo Galantis. It was released on 5 October 2014 as the lead single from their debut studio album Pharmacy (2015). The song features uncredited production work by Svidden, as well as Julia Karlsson performing the chorus and Cathy Dennis performing two verses on heavily processed and uncredited vocals.

"Runaway (U & I)" became Galantis' biggest hit single. In early 2015 it achieved chart success on the Australian Singles Chart reaching number four, and on the New Zealand Singles Chart, where it peaked at number six. It also debuted at number four on the UK Singles Chart and has since sold over 1,200,000 units, receiving a double platinum certification from the British Phonographic Industry (BPI) in October 2021.

The song was written by Anton Rundberg, Julia Karlsson, Linus Eklöw, Christian Karlsson, Jimmy Koitzsch, and Cathy Dennis. Billboard ranked the song at number five on its "The 10 Best Electronic/Dance Songs of 2014" list. "Runaway (U & I)" received a nomination for Best Dance Recording at the 58th Grammy Awards, but lost to "Where Are Ü Now".

The song is written in B-flat minor at a tempo of 126 beats per minute.

Music video
A music video to accompany the release of "Runaway (U & I)" was first uploaded onto YouTube on 19 January 2015 at a total length of four minutes and twenty-three seconds. As of November 2022, the video has accumulated over 400 million views.

Remixes and samples
"Runaway (U & I)" has been remixed by several high-profile producers. Dillon Francis, DJ Mustard, Ansolo, KSHMR, Kaskade, Gioni and Quintino are among the artists who have remixed the track. Dillon Francis' version in particular has grabbed the highest praise with a trap version of the song. An additional remix by electronic artists Svidden and Jarly was featured in the film Paper Towns.

The song was sampled in the Shades remixed version of Canon's "Grow Up" featuring Tragic Hero.

Uses in pop culture
In July 2015, it was used in season 1, episode 3 entitled “Move the Chains”, of the HBO series Ballers, during the party scene.

The song was used in a 2016 commercial for Absolut Vodka's #absolutnights ad campaign, in the theatrical trailer and TV spots for the animated film Ratchet & Clank and in the racing video game Forza Horizon 3. The song is also featured in the dance rhythm game, Just Dance 2021.

During the 2020 NFL season, CBS Sports used the song as transition music when cutting to commercial breaks.

Track listing

Charts

Weekly charts

Year-end charts

Certifications

Release history

References

External links

2014 singles
2014 songs
Songs written by Cathy Dennis
Songs written by Christian Karlsson (DJ)
Warner Music Group singles
Synth-pop ballads
Dutch Top 40 number-one singles
Songs written by Style of Eye
Galantis songs
Songs written by Svidden
Songs written by Anton Rundberg